Església de Sant Serni de Canillo  is a church located in Canillo, Andorra. It is a heritage property registered in the Cultural Heritage of Andorra. It was built in the 17-18th century.

References

Canillo
Roman Catholic churches in Andorra
Cultural Heritage of Andorra